John Yeboah Zamora (born 23 June 2000) is a German professional footballer who plays as a winger for Polish club Śląsk Wrocław.

Club career
Yeboah began his youth career with Hamburg clubs SV Rönneburg and FC Türkiye Wilhelmsburg, before moving to youth team of VfL Wolfsburg in 2015. In February 2018, Yeboah signed his first professional contract with Wolfsburg, lasting three years until 30 June 2021.

Yeboah made his professional debut for VfL Wolfsburg in the Bundesliga on 3 November 2018, coming on as a substitute in the 81st minute for Josip Brekalo in the 0–1 home loss against Borussia Dortmund.

In September 2019, Yeboah joined VVV-Venlo on a season-long loan deal.

He was loaned to MSV Duisburg in January 2022 from his parent club, Willem II.

On 25 June 2022, he joined Polish club Śląsk Wrocław on a three-year deal. On 15 July 2022, he made his Ekstraklasa debut, coming on as a substitute in the 0–0 Lower Silesia derby draw against Zagłębie Lubin.

International career
Yeboah began his youth international career with the Germany under-16 team, making his debut on 16 May 2016 in a friendly against France, which finished as a 1–1 away draw. In 2017, he was included in Germany's squad for the 2017 UEFA European Under-17 Championship in Croatia. He scored against Serbia in the group stage, with Germany managing to reach the semi-finals before losing on penalties to Spain. Later that year, Yeboah was included in Germany's squad for the 2017 FIFA U-17 World Cup in India. He scored against Colombia in the round of 16, with Germany later being eliminated in the quarter-finals.

Personal life
Yeboah was born in Hamburg, Germany to Ghanaian and Ecuadorian parents.

Career statistics

Honours
Individual
 Ekstraklasa Player of the Month: February 2023

References

External links

2000 births
Living people
Footballers from Hamburg
German footballers
Germany youth international footballers
German sportspeople of Ghanaian descent
German people of Ecuadorian descent
Sportspeople of Ecuadorian descent
Association football wingers
VfL Wolfsburg players
VfL Wolfsburg II players
VVV-Venlo players
Willem II (football club) players
Almere City FC players
MSV Duisburg players
Śląsk Wrocław players
Bundesliga players
3. Liga players
Regionalliga players
Eredivisie players
Eerste Divisie players
Ekstraklasa players
German expatriate footballers
German expatriate sportspeople in the Netherlands
Expatriate footballers in the Netherlands
German expatriate sportspeople in Poland
Expatriate footballers in Poland